The Kyrgyzstan national basketball team is the national Basketball team of Kyrgyzstan, Asia. Their last match was in the 2015 FIBA Asia Championship qualification Central Asia playoff, a rout loss to Kazakhstan in Astana. The majority of their best players play in Kazakhstan, including rebounding expert center Sergei Kazantcev and Turkish-born player Andrey Kislitsin.

The team had its best year in 1995. Then, at the official 1995 Asian Basketball Championship, the team surprisingly finished ahead of favorites such as Iran, Philippines and Jordan.

A prominent player of Kyrgyzstani descent is also Kyranbek Makan who plays for China because he was born and raised there.

Liga Forward
The only league in Kyrgyzstan is Liga Forward which consists of mostly Kyrgyzstan players but also features ex-Kazakhstan internationals and ex-Uzbekistan internationals. Most Kyrgyzstan players start off in Liga Forward but they usually move elsewhere like the National Basketball League (Kazakhstan) or the Division 1 of Uzbekistan.

Kyrgyzstan National Basketball Team

Roster
Head coach: Iliya Isakov

 Artem Borodenko      | pos =        | m =      | kg =    | team = Dank
 Aleksandr Adeykin    | pos = F      | m =      | kg = 94 | team = Bishkek Dynamo
      | pos = C      | m = 2.23 | kg =    | team = Barsy Atyrau|

Depth chart

Former players
Dmitriy Danishin (2003-2010)
Vladimir Gellert (2007-2012)
Baish Adiyev     (2008-2011)

Non National Team Players
   Andrey Kislitsin
   Denis Polokhin
  Anton Dorosev
  Erns Uulu Zhanysh

Coaches

Current Staff

Results

FIBA Asia Cup

Novruz Cup

Footnotes
*Was Assistant Coach but the Liga Forward had to make a quick decision to put him as an Interim Coach. He only took charge for 2 matches in which Kyrinakov lost both and therefore was fired. However, it is unknown who was coach after that and it is also unknown that they played any games.

See also
Kyrgyzstan women's national basketball team
Kyrgyzstan national under-19 basketball team
Kyrgyzstan national under-17 basketball team
Kyrgyzstan national 3x3 team

References

External links
Official website 

1992 establishments in Kyrgyzstan
Men's national basketball teams
National sports teams of Kyrgyzstan
Sport in Kyrgyzstan